Diana Deedan Muyira (commonly referred to as just Deedan or Miss Deedan), is a Ugandan actress and media personality,  known for playing the role of Tracy Kintu in Nana Kagga’s  Beneath The Lies. Deedan was born in Kenya and moved to Uganda to work.

Career
Deedan has been the host of Kampala’s biggest music festival, Blankets and Wine since its inception. She has hosted many other events including Tokosa Food Fest. Deedan is a radio presenter on Radiocity Kampala and hosts, with her counterpart McKenzie, The Jam, an evening drive show which features music and information for Kampala.

She joined the Urban Today show in 2016 after the departure of Gaetano Kagwa. In 2014, Deedan debuted her acting career on Beneath The Lies, playing Tracy Kintu, a woman from a rich family who faces domestic abuse from her husband.

Filmography

Television series

See also
 Flavia Tumusiime
 Nana Kagga
 Gaetano Kagwa

References

External links
 

Living people
Kenyan radio presenters
Kenyan emigrants to Uganda
21st-century Kenyan actresses
Kenyan television actresses
Kenyan women radio presenters
Year of birth missing (living people)